Lean on Me is a 1989 American biographical drama film written by Michael Schiffer, directed by John G. Avildsen and starring Morgan Freeman. It is based on the story of Joe Louis Clark, a real life inner city high school principal in Paterson, New Jersey, whose school is in danger of being placed into receivership of the New Jersey state government unless students improve their test scores on the New Jersey Minimum Basic Skills Test. This film's title refers to the 1972 Bill Withers song of the same name, which is used in the film.
Parts of the film, including the elementary school scenes, were filmed in Franklin Lakes, New Jersey.

Plot
In 1987, the once idyllic Eastside High School in Paterson, New Jersey, has deteriorated due to drug abuse and crime running rampant throughout the school. The majority of students cannot pass basic skills testing, and even the teachers are not safe from gang violence.

Mayor Bottman learns that the school will be turned over to state administration unless 75% of the students can pass the minimum basic skills test. He consults with school superintendent Dr. Frank Napier, who suggests they hire Joe Clark, a former teacher of Eastside High who was forcibly transferred years before due to budget cuts, as the new school principal. Reluctantly, the mayor hires Clark.

Known as "Crazy Joe", Clark's immediate radical changes include expelling 300 students identified as drug dealers or abusers and troublemakers, instituting programs to improve school spirit including painting over graffiti-covered walls, and requiring students to learn the school song, and be punished if they cannot sing it on demand. When one of the expelled students is found beating up another student, Clark orders the doors of the school chained shut during school hours since funds are insufficient to purchase security doors.

Clark's actions begin to have a positive effect on his students. He encounters Sams, a young student expelled for crack use, who pleads to be allowed back into school. Clark escorts Sams up to the roof of the school; there he viciously berates the boy for using crack, demanding that he jump off the edge of the building. Clark is (secretly) elated, when the now-hysterical Sams refuses to jump and proceeds to turn himself around. Clark also reunites one of his old elementary school students, Kaneesha Carter, with her estranged mother.

Some parents react strongly to these measures, particularly Leonna Barrett, the mother of one of the expelled students, who presses the mayor to oust Clark.

Clark's radicalism brings him into conflict with his own faculty, notably: Mr. Darnell, an English teacher, whom Clark suspends for picking up a piece of trash during a recital of the school song; Mrs. Elliot, a music teacher, whom Clark fires for being insubordinate after he cancels a long-planned choral event (the school's upcoming annual Lincoln Center concert). Napier lectures Clark over these incidents, demanding that he act as a team player; Clark subsequently re-instates Mr. Darnell.

Unfortunately, a practice basic skills test fails to garner enough passing students. Clark confronts his staff for their failure to educate their students, and to prepare them for the world. Clark institutes a tutorial program to strengthen academic skills; he also encourages remedial reading courses on Saturdays, so that parents may attend alongside their children if they want (or need) to.

When the day for the minimum basic skills test finally arrives, the students are much better prepared and filled with a sense of self-worth. Before the scores can be calculated, the fire chief raids the school and discovers the chained doors. Clark is arrested for violating fire safety codes. That evening, the students gather at the meeting of the Paterson Board of Education, where school board member Leonna is leading the call for Clark's removal.

The students demand that Clark be released from jail and retained as principal. The mayor has Clark released from jail, so that he may urge the children to return home for their own safety. He is interrupted by assistant principal Ms. Levias, who reports that more than 75% of the students have passed the basic skills test. He announces the results over his megaphone.

As a result, the school's current administration remains intact. Clark is allowed to keep his job as principal, as he cheerfully informs the mayor that "You can tell the State to go to hell." The students celebrate by breaking into their school song. The film ends with the senior students, including Sams, graduating high school (amid the closing credits); Clark hands them their diplomas.

Cast

 Morgan Freeman as Joe Louis Clark
 Beverly Todd as Mrs. Joan Levias
 Robert Guillaume as Dr. Frank Napier
 Alan North as Mayor Don Bottman (based on Frank X. Graves Jr.)
 Lynne Thigpen as Leonna Barrett
 Robin Bartlett as Mrs. Elliott
 Michael Beach as Mr. Larry Darnell
 Ethan Phillips as Mr. Rosenberg
 Sandra Reaves-Phillips as Mrs. Powers
 Sloane Shelton as Mrs. Hamilton
 Jermaine 'Huggy' Hopkins as Thomas Sams
 Karen Malina White as Kaneesha Carter
 Karina Arroyave as Maria
 Ivonne Coll as Mrs. Santos
 Regina Taylor as Mrs. Carter
 Michael P. Moran as Mr. Ed O'Malley
 John Ring as Fire Chief Gaines
 Tyrone Jackson as Clarence
 Alex Romaguera as "Kid" Ray  
 Tony Todd as William Wright, Dean of Security 
 Mike Starr as Mr. Zirella
 Riff (Michael Best, Steven Capers Jr., Anthony Fuller, Dwayne Jones, and Kenneth Kelly) as the Eastside Songbirds
 Yvette Hawkins as Mrs. Arthur
 Nicole Quinn as Lillian
 Elsie Hilario as Louisa
 Michael A. Joseph as Brian Banes (drug dealer who threatens Clark with switchblade)
 Richard Grusin as Mr. Danley
 Jim Moody as Mr. Lott (prologue)
 Veniece Ross as Sally
 Raul Gonzales as Ramon
 Johanna "Luz" Tolentino as Conchita
 Andre Howell as Reggie
 Nancy Gathers	as Tanya
 Corey Ginn as Charles Yale
 Marina Durell as Miss Ruiz
 Nathalee Fairmon as herself
 Reverend Herschell Slappy as himself
 Todd Alexander as Derrick
 Anthony Figueroa as Hoodlum at Microphone
 Delilah Cotto	as Chita
 Frances Sousa	as Francesca
 Robert Kamlot	as Photographer
 Linda M. Salgado as herself
 Markus Toure Boddie as himself
 Ashon Curvy as himself
 Michael Imperioli as George (student who gets "expurgated")
 Marcella Lowery as Mrs. Richards
 Jennifer McComb as Ellen (Clark's student in prologue)
 Knowl Johnson	as Tom (Clark's student in prologue)
 Anthony G. Avildsen (the director's real-life son) as Clark's student in prologue
 Heather Rose Dominic as Stacey (Clark's student in prologue)
 Bruce Malmuth	as the Burger Joint Manager
 Mushond "Steven" Lee as Richard Armand
 Jose R. Severino as John Jones  
 Cole Dragone as Boss
 David Nelson as Real Student

Music
Songs included in the film include:
"Eastside High School Alma Mater", written by Catherine Peragallo Miller 
"Welcome to the Jungle" by Guns N' Roses
"I Ain't Makin' It" by Daddy-O and DBC
"Lean on Me" by Thelma Houston
"Lean on Me" by Club Nouveau
"Rap Summary (Lean on Me)" by Big Daddy Kane
"You are the one" by TKA
"Skeezer" by Roxanne Shante
"After 12" by Force M.D.'s
"All the way to love" by Siedah Garrett
"Everybody is somebody" by RIFF, Teen Dream, and Taja Sevelle
"Hit the road Jack" by Percy Mayfield

Reception
On review aggregator website Rotten Tomatoes, the film has a rating of 68%, based on 19 reviews, with an average rating of 5.8/10. On CinemaScore, audiences gave the film a rare grade of "A+" on an A+ to F scale.

Awards and honors
1989 NAACP Image Awards
Outstanding Lead Actor in a Motion Picture – Morgan Freeman (won)
Outstanding Motion Picture (won)

1990 Young Artist Awards
Young Artist Award Best Motion Picture – Drama (nominated)
Best Young Actor Supporting Role in a Motion Picture – Jermaine 'Huggy' Hopkins (nominated)
Best Young Actress Supporting Role in a Motion Picture – Karen Malina White (nominated)
Jackie Coogan Award – Norman Twain, producer (nominated)

Other honors

The film is recognized by American Film Institute in these lists:
 2003: AFI's 100 Years...100 Heroes & Villains:
 “Crazy” Joe Clark – Nominated Hero
 2004: AFI's 100 Years...100 Songs:
 "Lean on Me" – Nominated
 2006: AFI's 100 Years...100 Cheers – Nominated

Aborted television adaptation
On September 13, 2018, it was reported that a television series based on the film was in development at The CW. The project, hailing from Warner Bros. Television, was written by Wendy Calhoun, with LeBron James, Maverick Carter, John Legend, Mike Jackson and Ty Stiklorius also set to executive produce. The female-led drama was to center around "when a spirited young black teacher [named] Amarie Baldwin scores the principal job at an Akron, Ohio, public high school, she must dig deep to transform a failing campus into an urban oasis. In a time when education and school safety have life-or-death stakes, Amarie will take on a broken system that tests her mettle, love life and family. But can she keep her moxie in check in order to embody the aspirational educator that motivates and uplifts an entire community?" On February 8, 2019, it was revealed that the script was not picked up to pilot.

See also 

 List of hood films

References

External links

 
 
 
 
 

1989 films
American coming-of-age drama films
1980s coming-of-age drama films
African-American biographical dramas
Warner Bros. films
American high school films
Films about school violence
Films about race and ethnicity
Films scored by Bill Conti
Films set in New Jersey
Drama films based on actual events
Films directed by John G. Avildsen
Films about educators
History of Paterson, New Jersey
Films shot in New Jersey
1980s biographical drama films
1989 drama films
Cultural depictions of educators
1980s English-language films
1980s American films